Carroll Vogelaar (April 8, 1920 – December 7, 1967) was an American football tackle and defensive tackle. He played for the Boston/New York Yanks from 1947 to 1950.

References

1920 births
1967 deaths
Players of American football from California
American football tackles
American football defensive tackles
Loyola Lions football players
San Francisco Dons football players
Sportspeople from Riverside County, California
Boston Yanks players
New York Yanks players